The 2010 Pittsburgh Pirates season was the 129th season of the franchise; the 124th in the National League. This was their tenth season at PNC Park. The 2010 season was the Pirates' MLB-record 18th consecutive losing season.  (This is also the longest for any major professional North American sport). The Pirates finished sixth and last in the National League Central with a record of 57–105, their worst record since 1952.

Off-season
The Pirates used the off-season to pick up bullpen help, signing relievers Javier López, Brendan Donnelly and former closer Octavio Dotel to one-year contracts. They also added a shortstop, Bobby Crosby and re-signed shortstop Ronny Cedeño. The Pirates were intent on not having a losing season for the 18th straight year, though it happened.

Regular season

Divisional standings

Roster

Opening Day lineup

2010 Results

Game log

|- style="background:#cfc;"
| 1 || April 5 || Dodgers || 11–5 || Duke (1–0) || Padilla (0–1) || — || 39,024 || 1–0
|- style="background:#cfc;"
| 2 || April 7 || Dodgers || 4–3 (10) || Donnelly (1–0) || Ortiz (0–1) || — || 31,061 || 2–0
|- style="background:#fbb;"
| 3 || April 8 || Dodgers || 2–10 || Billingsley (1–0) || Maholm (0–1) || — || 9,352 || 2–1
|- style="background:#fbb;"
| 4 || April 9 || @ Diamondbacks || 1–9 || Lopez (1–0) || Morton (0–1) || — || 21,316 || 2–2
|- style="background:#cfc;"
| 5 || April 10 || @ Diamondbacks || 6–3 || Duke (2–0) || Haren (1–1) || Dotel (1) || 22,407 || 3–2
|- style="background:#fbb;"
| 6 || April 11 || @ Diamondbacks || 6–15 || Jackson (1–1) || McCutchen (0–1) || — || 21,061 || 3–3
|- style="background:#fbb;"
| 7 || April 12 || @ Giants || 3–9 || Zito (2–0) || Burres (0–1) || — || 26,011 || 3–4
|- style="background:#cfc;"
| 8 || April 13 || @ Giants || 6–5 || Meek (1–0) || Affeldt (2–1) || Dotel (2) || 28,030 || 4–4
|- style="background:#fbb;"
| 9 || April 14 || @ Giants || 0–6 || Sanchez (1–0) || Morton (0–2) || — || 29,028 || 4–5
|- style="background:#cfc;"
| 10 || April 16 || Reds || 4–3 || Dotel (1–0) || Masset (2–1) || — || 14,758 || 5–5
|- style="background:#cfc;"
| 11 || April 17 || Reds || 5–4 || Taschner (1–0) || Cordero (1–1) || — || 25,196 || 6–5
|- style="background:#cfc;"
| 12 || April 18 || Reds || 5–3 || Maholm (1–1) || Arroyo (0–1) || Dotel (3) || 13,860 || 7–5
|- style="background:#fbb;"
| 13 || April 20 || Brewers || 1–8 || Bush (1–0) || Morton (0–3) || — || 9,386 || 7–6
|- style="background:#fbb;"
| 14 || April 21 || Brewers || 0–8 || Gallardo (1–2) || Duke (2–1) || — || 12,192 || 7–7
|- style="background:#fbb;"
| 15 || April 22 || Brewers || 0–20 || Wolf (2–1) || McCutchen (0–2) || — || 13,634 || 7–8
|- style="background:#fbb;"
| 16 || April 23 || @ Astros || 3–4 || Oswalt (2–2) || Maholm (1–2) || Lindstrom (5) || 30,018 || 7–9
|- style="background:#fbb;"
| 17 || April 24 || @ Astros || 2–5 || Rodriguez (1–2) || Jakubauskas (0–1) || Lindstrom (6) || 30,562 || 7–10
|- style="background:#fbb;"
| 18 || April 25 || @ Astros || 3–10 || Myers (1–1) || Morton (0–4) || — || 27,210 || 7–11
|- style="background:#fbb;"
| 19 || April 26 || @ Brewers || 3–17 || Gallardo (2–2) || Duke (2–2) || — || 25,892 || 7–12
|- style="background:#cfc;"
| 20 || April 27 || @ Brewers || 7–3 || Donnelly (2–0) || Hoffman (1–2) || — || 28,991 || 8–12
|- style="background:#cfc;"
| 21 || April 28 || @ Brewers || 6–5 (14) || Carrasco (1–0) || Parra (0–1) || — || 28,401 || 9–12
|- style="background:#cfc;"
| 22 || April 29 || @ Dodgers || 2–0 || Burres (1–1) || Kershaw (1–1) || Meek (1) || 40,185 || 10–12
|- style="background:#fbb;"
| 23 || April 30 || @ Dodgers || 2–6 || Billingsley (2–1) || Morton (0–5) || — || 46,775 || 10–13
|-

|- style="background:#fbb;"
| 24 || May 1 || @ Dodgers || 1–5 || Ortiz (1–1) || Duke (2–3) || — || 40,483 || 10–14
|- style="background:#fbb;"
| 25 || May 2 || @ Dodgers || 3–9 || Kuroda (3–1) || Karstens (0–1) || — || 39,339 || 10–15
|- style="background:#cfc;"
| 26 || May 4 || Cubs || 3–2 || Maholm (2–2) || Dempster (2–2) || Dotel (4) || 10,972 || 11–15
|- style="background:#cfc;"
| 27 || May 5 || Cubs || 4–2 || Morton (1–5) || Lilly (1–2) || Dotel (5) || 11,053 || 12–15
|- style="background:#cfc;"
| 28 || May 6 || Cubs || 11–1 || Burres (2–1) || Wells (3–1) || — || 11,085 || 13–15
|- style="background:#fbb;"
| 29 || May 7 || Cardinals || 3–4 || Franklin (2–0) || Meek (1–1) || — || 16,473 || 13–16
|- style="background:#cfc;"
| 30 || May 8 || Cardinals || 2–0 || Karstens (1–1) || Garcia (3–2) || Dotel (6) || 25,047 || 14–16
|- style="background:#fbb;"
| 31 || May 9 || Cardinals || 4–11 || Wainwright (5–1) || Maholm (2–3) || — || 17,342 || 14–17
|- style="background:#fbb;"
| 32 || May 10 || Reds || 1–2 || Arroyo (2–2) || Ohlendorf (0–1) || Cordero (11) || 9,045 || 14–18
|- style="background:#fbb;"
| 33 || May 11 || Reds || 0–9 || Cueto (2–1) || Morton (1–6) || — || 9,027 || 14–19
|- style="background:#fbb;"
| 34 || May 12 || Reds || 0–5 || Bailey (1–2) || Duke (2–4) || — || 20,064 || 14–20
|- style="background:#cfc;"
| 35 || May 14 || @ Cubs || 10–6 || Meek (2–1) || Zambrano (1–3) || — || 39,082 || 15–20
|- style="background:#cfc;"
| 36 || May 15 || @ Cubs || 4–3 || Maholm (3–3) || Dempster (2–4) || Dotel (7) || 41,336 || 16–20
|- style="background:#fbb;"
| 37 || May 16 || @ Cubs || 3–4 || Marshall (2–1) || Carrasco (1–1) || Marmol (6) || 40,636 || 16–21
|- style="background:#fbb;"
| 38 || May 17 || @ Phillies || 2–12 || Kendrick (2–1) || Morton (1–7) || — || 45,371 || 16–22
|- style="background:#cfc;"
| 39 || May 18 || @ Phillies || 2–1 || Duke (3–4) || Halladay (6–2) || Dotel (8) || 45,007 || 17–22
|- style="background:#cfc;"
| 40 || May 19 || Brewers || 6–4 || Lopez (1–0) || Wolf (3–4) || Dotel (9) || 9,526 || 18–22
|- style="background:#fbb;"
| 41 || May 20 || Brewers || 3–4 || Narveson (4–1) || Maholm (3–4) || Villanueva (1) || 13,975 || 18–23
|- style="background:#fbb;"
| 42 || May 21 || Braves || 0–7 || Hudson (5–1) || Ohlendorf (0–2) || — || 22,470 || 18–24
|- style="background:#fbb;"
| 43 || May 22 || Braves || 2–4 || Lowe (6–4) || Morton (1–8) || Wagner (5) || 26,519 || 18–25
|- style="background:#cfc;"
| 44 || May 23 || Braves || 3–2 (10) || Dotel (2–0) || Saito (0–2) || — || 23,045 || 19–25
|- style="background:#fbb;"
| 45 || May 24 || @ Reds || 5–7 || Harang (3–5) || Burres (2–2) || Cordero (15) || 13,385 || 19–26
|- style="background:#cfc;"
| 46 || May 25 || @ Reds || 2–1 || Hanrahan (1–0) || Masset (3–3) || Dotel (10) || 14,471 || 20–26
|- style="background:#fbb;"
| 47 || May 26 || @ Reds || 0–4 || Arroyo (5–2) || Ohlendorf (0–3) || — || 18,137 || 20–27
|- style="background:#fbb;"
| 48 || May 27 || @ Reds || 2–8 || Cueto (5–1) || Morton (1–9) || — || 16,834 || 20–28
|- style="background:#fbb;"
| 49 || May 28 || @ Braves || 3–7 || Lowe (7–4) || Duke (3–5) || — || 23,442 || 20–29
|- style="background:#fbb;"
| 50 || May 29 || @ Braves || 3–6 || Medlen (2–1) || Burres (2–3) || Wagner (6) || 29,132 || 20–30
|- style="background:#fbb;"
| 51 || May 30 || @ Braves || 2–5 || Saito (1–2) || Hanrahan (1–1) || Wagner (7) || 31,078 || 20–31
|- style="background:#cfc;"
| 52 || May 31 || Cubs || 2–1 || Meek (3–1) || Marshall (5–2) || Dotel (11) || 20,235 || 21–31
|-

|- style="background:#cfc;"
| 53 || June 1 || Cubs || 3–2 || Hanrahan (2–1) || Lilly (1–5) || Dotel (12) || 11,334 || 22–31
|- style="background:#fbb;"
| 54 || June 4 || Giants || 4–6 || Sanchez (4–4) || Duke (3–6) || Wilson (14) || 17,817 || 22–32
|- style="background:#cfc;"
| 55 || June 5 || Giants || 6–3 || Maholm (4–4) || Wellemeyer (3–5) || — || 36,687 || 23–32
|- style="background:#fbb;"
| 56 || June 6 || Giants || 5–6 (10) || Wilson (2–0) || Dotel (2–1) || Casilla (1) || 24,068 || 23–33
|- style="background:#fbb;"
| 57 || June 7 || Cubs || 1–6 || Silva (8–0) || Eveland (0–1) || Marshall (1) || 12,768 || 23–34
|- style="background:#fbb;"
| 58 || June 8 || @ Nationals || 2–5 || Strasburg (1–0) || Karstens (1–2) || Capps (19) || 40,315 || 23–35
|- style="background:#fbb;"
| 59 || June 9 || @ Nationals || 5–7 || Storen (2–0) || Carrasco (1–2) || Capps (20) || 18,876 || 23–36
|- style="background:#fbb;"
| 60 || June 10 || @ Nationals || 2–4 || Hernandez (5–3) || Duke (3–7) || Clippard (1) || 21,767 || 23–37
|- style="background:#fbb;"
| 61 || June 11 || @ Tigers || 2–6 || Verlander (7–4) || Ohlendorf (0–4) || — || 33,236 || 23–38
|- style="background:#fbb;"
| 62 || June 12 || @ Tigers || 3–4 (10) || Coke (4–0) || Donnelly (2–1) || — || 34,501 || 23–39
|- style="background:#fbb;"
| 63 || June 13 || @ Tigers || 3–4 || Thomas (4–0) || Lopez (1–1) || Valverde (13) || 31,243 || 23–40
|- style="background:#fbb;"
| 64 || June 15 || White Sox || 4–6 || Garcia (7–3) || Lincoln (0–1) || Jenks (12) || 12,693 || 23–41
|- style="background:#fbb;"
| 65 || June 16 || White Sox || 2–7 || Danks (6–5) || Duke (3–8) || — || 15,218 || 23–42
|- style="background:#fbb;"
| 66 || June 17 || White Sox || 4–5 || Buehrle (5–6) || Ohlendorf (0–5) || Jenks (13) || 23,170 || 23–43
|- style="background:#fbb;"
| 67 || June 18 || Indians || 3–4 || Hernandez (6–5) || Maholm (4–5) || Wood (5) || 28,478 || 23–44
|- style="background:#cfc;"
| 68 || June 19 || Indians || 6–4 || Karstens (2–2) || Huff (2–9) || Dotel (13) || 38,008 || 24–44
|- style="background:#cfc;"
| 69 || June 20 || Indians || 5–3 || Donnelly (3–1) || Lewis (2–2) || Dotel (14) || 29,845 || 25–44
|- style="background:#fbb;"
| 70 || June 22 || @ Rangers || 3–6 || Hunter (3–0) || Ohlendorf (0–6) || Feliz (20) || 23,083 || 25–45
|- style="background:#fbb;"
| 71 || June 23 || @ Rangers || 3–13 || Ogando (3–0) || Maholm (4–6) || Harrison (1) || 33,646 || 25–46
|- style="background:#fbb;"
| 72 || June 24 || @ Rangers || 5–6 || Francisco (6–3) || Jackson (0–1) || — || 19,567 || 25–47
|- style="background:#fbb;"
| 73 || June 25 || @ Athletics || 4–14 || Sheets (3–7) || Lincoln (0–2) || — || 11,154 || 25–48
|- style="background:#fbb;"
| 74 || June 26 || @ Athletics || 0–5 || Cahill (7–2) || McCutchen (0–3) || — || 25,068 || 25–49
|- style="background:#fbb;"
| 75 || June 27 || @ Athletics || 2–3 || Breslow (3–1) || Meek (3–2) || Bailey (14) || 15,238 || 25–50
|- style="background:#cfc;"
| 76 || June 28 || @ Cubs || 2–1 || Maholm (5–6) || Cashner (0–2) || Dotel (15) || 38,512 || 26–50
|- style="background:#fbb;"
| 77 || June 29 || @ Cubs || 1–3 || Lilly (3–6) || Karstens (2–3) || Marmol (14) || 36,914 || 26–51
|- style="background:#cfc;"
| 78 || June 30 || @ Cubs || 2–0 || Lincoln (1–2) || Cashner (0–3) || Dotel (16) || 37,391 || 27–51
|-

|- style="background:#cfc;"
| 79 || July 1 || Phillies || 3–2 || McCutchen (1–3) || Hamels (6–7) || Dotel (17) || 25,323 || 28–51
|- style="background:#cfc;"
| 80 || July 2 || Phillies || 2–0 || Ohlendorf (1–6) || Moyer (9–7) || Dotel (18) || 30,339 || 29–51
|- style="background:#fbb;"
| 81 || July 3 || Phillies || 4–12 || Kendrick (5–3) || Maholm (5–7) || — || 38,052 || 29–52
|- style="background:#cfc;"
| 82 || July 4 || Phillies || 8–5 || Meek (4–2) || Contreras (3–3) || Dotel (19) || 28,698 || 30–52
|- style="background:#fbb;"
| 83 || July 6 || @ Astros || 2–6 || Rodriguez (6–10) || Lincoln (1–3) || — || 23,210 || 30–53
|- style="background:#fbb;"
| 84 || July 7 || @ Astros || 3–6 || Daigle (1–1) || McCutchen (1–4) || Lindstrom (20) || 23,123 || 30–54
|- style="background:#fbb;"
| 85 || July 8 || @ Astros || 0–2 || Oswalt (6–10) || Ohlendorf (1–7) || — || 24,416 || 30–55
|- style="background:#fbb;"
| 86 || July 9 || @ Brewers || 4–5 (10) || Axford (4–1) || Meek (4–3) || — || 27,767 || 30–56
|- style="background:#fbb;"
| 87 || July 10 || @ Brewers || 3–4 || Bush (4–6) || Karstens (2–4) || Axford (10) || 38,588 || 30–57
|- style="background:#fbb;"
| 88 || July 11 || @ Brewers || 5–6 || Axford (5–1) || Dotel (2–2) || — || 34,598 || 30–58
|- style="background:#fbb;"
| 89 || July 16 || Astros || 2–5 || Myers (7–6) || Duke (3–9) || Lindstrom (22) || 23,273 || 30–59
|- style="background:#cfc;"
| 90 || July 17 || Astros || 12–6 || Lopez (2–1) || Norris (2–7) || — || 36,665 || 31–59
|- style="background:#cfc;"
| 91 || July 18 || Astros || 9–0 || Maholm (6–7) || Oswalt (6–11) || — || 16,638 || 32–59
|- style="background:#fbb;"
| 92 || July 19 || Brewers || 1–3 || Capuano (1–1) || Karstens (2–5) || Axford (12) || 12,375 || 32–60
|- style="background:#cfc;"
| 93 || July 20 || Brewers || 11–9 || Carrasco (2–2) || Bush (4–8) || Dotel (20) || 13,202 || 33–60
|- style="background:#cfc;"
| 94 || July 21 || Brewers || 15–3 || Duke (4–9) || Wolf (7–9) || — || 13,532 || 34–60
|- style="background:#fbb;"
| 95 || July 22 || Brewers || 2–3 || Gallardo (9–4) || Ohlendorf (1–8) || Axford (13) || 18,715 || 34–61
|- style="background:#fbb;"
| 96 || July 23 || Padres || 3–5 || Correia (7–6) || Maholm (6–8) || Bell (28) || 18,611 || 34–62
|- style="background:#fbb;"
| 97 || July 24 || Padres || 2–9 || Latos (11–4) || Karstens (2–6) || — || 36,967 || 34–63
|- style="background:#fbb;"
| 98 || July 25 || Padres || 3–6 || LeBlanc (5–8) || Lincoln (1–4) || Bell (29) || 18,800 || 34–64
|- style="background:#cfc;"
| 99 || July 27 || @ Rockies || 4–2 || Duke (5–9) || De La || Dotel (21) || 46,608 || 35–64
|- style="background:#cfc;"
| 100 || July 28 || @ Rockies || 6–2 || Gallagher (1–0) || Cook (4–7) || — || 35,128 || 36–64
|- style="background:#fbb;"
| 101 || July 29 || @ Rockies || 3–9 || Jimenez (16–2) || Maholm (6–9) || — || 34,158 || 36–65
|- style="background:#fbb;"
| 102 || July 30 || @ Cardinals || 0–1 (10) || Franklin (6–1) || Lopez (2–2) || — || 44,534 || 36–66
|- style="background:#fbb;"
| 103 || July 31 || @ Cardinals || 1–11 || Suppan (1–6) || McCutchen (1–5) || — || 45,783 || 36–67
|-

|- style="background:#fbb;"
| 104 || August 1 || @ Cardinals || 1–9 || Wainwright (15–6) || Duke (5–10) || — || 43,338 || 36–68
|- style="background:#fbb;"
| 105 || August 2 || Reds || 0–4 || Wood (2–1) || Ohlendorf (1–9) || — || 15,172 || 36–69
|- style="background:#cfc;"
| 106 || August 3 || Reds || 7–6 || Maholm (7–9) || Leake (7–3) || Hanrahan (1) || 13,623 || 37–69
|- style="background:#fbb;"
| 107 || August 4 || Reds || 4–9 || Cueto (11–2) || Karstens (2–7) || — || 20,420 || 37–70
|- style="background:#cfc;"
| 108 || August 5 || Rockies || 5–1 || McDonald (1–1) || Francis (4–4) || — || 17,131 || 38–70
|- style="background:#fbb;"
| 109 || August 6 || Rockies || 3–6 || Hammel (8–6) || Park (0–1) || Street (7) || 30,711 || 38–71
|- style="background:#cfc;"
| 110 || August 7 || Rockies || 8–7 (10) || Gallagher (2–0) || Street (2–3) || — || 38,147 || 39–71
|- style="background:#fbb;"
| 111 || August 8 || Rockies || 4–8 || Rogers (2–2) || Maholm (7–10) || — || 22,716 || 39–72
|- style="background:#fbb;"
| 112 || August 10 || @ Padres || 1–4 || LeBlanc (6–10) || Karstens (2–8) || Bell (32) || 23,249 || 39–73
|- style="background:#fbb;"
| 113 || August 11 || @ Padres || 5–8 || Correia (9–7) || McDonald (1–2) || Bell (33) || 28,335 || 39–74
|- style="background:#fbb;"
| 114 || August 12 || @ Padres || 0–3 || Garland (11–8) || Duke (5–11) || Bell (34) || 25,897 || 39–75
|- style="background:#fbb;"
| 115 || August 13 || @ Astros || 1–4 || Lopez (4–0) || Meek (4–4) || Lyon (3) || 36,124 || 39–76
|- style="background:#fbb;"
| 116 || August 14 || @ Astros || 2–3 || Norris (5–7) || Maholm (7–11) || Lyon (4) || 31,608 || 39–77
|- style="background:#fbb;"
| 117 || August 15 || @ Astros || 2–8 || Happ (3–1) || Karstens (2–9) || — || 34,372 || 39–78
|- style="background:#cfc;"
| 118 || August 16 || Marlins || 7–1 || McDonald (2–2) || Volstad (6–9) || — || 13,396 || 40–78
|- style="background:#fbb;"
| 119 || August 17 || Marlins || 0–6 || Nolasco (14–8) || Duke (5–12) || — || 14,156 || 40–79
|- style="background:#fbb;"
| 120 || August 18 || Marlins || 2–3 || Johnson (11–5) || Ohlendorf (1–10) || Oviedo (27) || 12,242 || 40–80
|- style="background:#fbb;"
| 121 || August 19 || Marlins || 2–4 || Sanabia (2–1) || Maholm (7–12) || Oviedo (28) || 15,783 || 40–81
|- style="background:#fbb;"
| 122 || August 20 || Mets || 2–7 || Pelfrey (12–7) || Karstens (2–10) || — || 23,695 || 40–82
|- style="background:#fbb;"
| 123 || August 21 || Mets || 1–5 (5) || Niese (8–5) || McDonald (2–3) || — || 28,759 || 40–83
|- style="background:#cfc;"
| 124 || August 22 || Mets || 2–1 || Duke (6–12) || Santana (10–8) || Hanrahan (2) || 24,730 || 41–83
|- style="background:#fbb;"
| 125 || August 23 || Cardinals || 2–10 || Lohse (2–5) || Ohlendorf (1–11) || — || 12,393 || 41–84
|- style="background:#cfc;"
| 126 || August 24 || Cardinals || 4–3 || Hanrahan (3–1) || Wainwright (17–8) || Meek (2) || 13,302 || 42–84
|- style="background:#cfc;"
| 127 || August 25 || Cardinals || 5–2 || McCutchen (2–5) || Westbrook (1–2) || — || 12,686 || 43–84
|- style="background:#fbb;"
| 128 || August 27 || @ Brewers || 2–7 || Narveson (10–7) || McDonald (2–4) || — || 32,130 || 43–85
|- style="background:#fbb;"
| 129 || August 28 || @ Brewers || 7–8 (11) || Loe (3–3) || Ledezma (0–1) || — || 37,782 || 43–86
|- style="background:#fbb;"
| 130 || August 29 || @ Brewers || 4–8 || Bush (7–11) || Morton (1–10) || Hoffman (8) || 35,733 || 43–87
|- style="background:#fbb;"
| 131 || August 30 || @ Cubs || 2–14 || Zambrano (6–6) || Maholm (7–13) || — || 29,538 || 43–88
|- style="background:#cfc;"
| 132 || August 31 || @ Cubs || 14–7 || Karstens (3–10) || Dempster (12–9) || — || 31,369 || 44–88
|-

|- style="background:#fbb;"
| 133 || September 1 || @ Cubs || 3–5 || Diamond (1–3) || McDonald (2–5) || Marmol (25) || 33,555 || 44–89
|- style="background:#cfc;"
| 134 || September 3 || Nationals || 8–5 || Duke (7–12) || Hernandez (9–10) || Hanrahan (3) || 19,734 || 45–89
|- style="background:#fbb;"
| 135 || September 4 || Nationals || 2–9 || Lannan (7–6) || Maholm (7–14) || — || 30,263 || 45–90
|- style="background:#fbb;"
| 136 || September 5 || Nationals || 1–8 || Marquis (2–7) || Morton (1–11) || — || 18,057 || 45–91
|- style="background:#cfc;"
| 137 || September 6 || Braves || 3–1 || Burres (3–3) || Hanson (9–11) || Hanrahan (4) || 15,330 || 46–91
|- style="background:#cfc;"
| 138 || September 7 || Braves || 5–0 || McDonald (3–5) || Hudson (15–7) || — || 11,070 || 47–91
|- style="background:#fbb;"
| 139 || September 8 || Braves || 3–9 || Lowe (12–12) || Duke (7–13) || — || 13,113 || 47–92
|- style="background:#fbb;"
| 140 || September 10 || @ Reds || 3–4 (12) || Smith (3–2) || Ledezma (0–2) || — || 24,908 || 47–93
|- style="background:#fbb;"
| 141 || September 11 || @ Reds || 4–5 (10) || Cordero (6–4) || Thomas (0–1) || — || 36,101 || 47–94
|- style="background:#cfc;"
| 142 || September 12 || @ Reds || 3–1 || Park (1–1) || Cordero (6–5) || Hanrahan (5) || 26,617 || 48–94
|- style="background:#fbb;"
| 143 || September 13 || @ Mets || 0–1 (10) || Takahashi (9–6) || Park (1–2) || — || 24,384 || 48–95
|- style="background:#fbb;"
| 144 || September 14 || @ Mets || 1–9 || Dickey (11–6) || Duke (7–14) || — || 27,438 || 48–96
|- style="background:#fbb;"
| 145 || September 15 || @ Mets || 7–8 || Valdes (3–3) || Maholm (7–15) || Takahashi (7) || 29,000 || 48–97
|- style="background:#fbb;"
| 146 || September 16 || @ Mets || 2–6 || Pelfrey (15–9) || Ledezma (0–3) || — || 28,790 || 48–98
|- style="background:#cfc;"
| 147 || September 17 || Diamondbacks || 4–3 || Meek (5–4) || Vasquez (1–6) || — || 22,939 || 49–98
|- style="background:#cfc;"
| 148 || September 18 || Diamondbacks || 9–6 || McDonald (4–5) || Enright (6–5) || — || 25,981 || 50–98
|- style="background:#cfc;"
| 149 || September 19 || Diamondbacks || 4–3 || Hanrahan (4–1) || Heilman (5–8) || Meek (3) || 18,331 || 51–98
|- style="background:#cfc;"
| 150 || September 21 || Cardinals || 5–2 || Maholm (8–15) || Westbrook (2–4) || Meek (4) || 15,478 || 52–98
|- style="background:#cfc;"
| 151 || September 22 || Cardinals || 11–6 || Morton (2–11) || Lohse (4–8) || — || 11,785 || 53–98
|- style="background:#fbb;"
| 152 || September 23 || Cardinals || 2–9 || Suppan (2–7) || Burres (3–4) || — || 15,802 || 53–99
|- style="background:#fbb;"
| 153 || September 24 || Astros || 7–10 || Myers (14–7) || Leroux (0–1) || Lyon (19) || 22,279 || 53–100
|- style="background:#cfc;"
| 154 || September 25 || Astros || 6–4 || Duke (8–14) || Norris (9–9) || Hanrahan (6) || 25,350 || 54–100
|- style="background:#cfc;"
| 155 || September 26 || Astros || 9–3 || Maholm (9–15) || Happ (6–3) || — || 23,208 || 55–100
|- style="background:#fbb;"
| 156 || September 27 || @ Cardinals || 4–6 || Reyes (3–1) || Gallagher (2–1) || McClellan (2) || 38,592 || 55–101
|- style="background:#cfc;"
| 157 || September 28 || @ Cardinals || 7–2 || Burres (4–4) || Suppan (2–8) || — || 38,315 || 56–101
|- style="background:#fbb;"
| 158 || September 29 || @ Cardinals || 1–4 || Walters (2–0) || McDonald (4–6) || — || 38,112 || 56–102
|- style="background:#fbb;"
| 159 || September 30 || @ Marlins || 9–11 || Volstad (12–9) || Duke (8–15) || Oviedo (30) || 21,021 || 56–103
|-

|- style="background:#cfc;"
| 160 || October 1 || @ Marlins || 5–1 || Park (2–2) || Mendez (1–3) || — || 23,124 || 57–103
|- style="background:#fbb;"
| 161 || October 2 || @ Marlins || 0–2 || Sanches (2–2) || Morton (2–12) || Hensley (6) || 25,332 || 57–104
|- style="background:#fbb;"
| 162 || October 3 || @ Marlins || 2–5 || Sanchez (13–12) || Burres (4–5) || Hensley (7) || 31,803 || 57–105
|-

|-
| Legend:       = Win       = LossBold = Pirates team member

Record vs. opponents

Detailed records

Awards and honors

2010 Major League Baseball All-Star Game
Evan Meek, P, reserve

NL Player of the Week Award
Pedro Alvarez (September 20–26, 2010)

Statistics
Hitting
Note: G = Games played; AB = At bats; H = Hits; Avg. = Batting average; HR = Home runs; RBI = Runs batted in

Pitching
Note: G = Games pitched; IP = Innings pitched; W = Wins; L = Losses; ERA = Earned run average; SO = Strikeouts

Transactions

Pre-season
(November 4, 2009 – April 4, 2010)
On November 20, 2009 the Pittsburgh Pirates claimed Chris Jakubauskas off waivers from the Seattle Mariners.
On November 30, 2009 the Pittsburgh Pirates lost free agent Rubén Gotay to the St. Louis Cardinals.
On November 30, 2009 the Pittsburgh Pirates signed Toronto Blue Jays free agent Wil Ledezma to a minor league contract.
On December 3, 2009 the Pittsburgh Pirates promoted Kevan Graves to assistant director of baseball operations and hired Mike Basso as a major league scout, Toshi Nagahara as assistant trainer and Tyrone Brooks as director of baseball operations.
On December 7, 2009 the Pittsburgh Pirates signed Cleveland Indians free agent Vinnie Chulk to a minor league contract.
On December 10, 2009 the Pittsburgh Pirates signed free agent Bobby Crosby to a 1-year/$1 million contract, claimed John Raynor in Rule 5 major league draft (#2 overall from Florida Marlins) and claimed Rodolfo Cardona in Rule 5 AAA draft (#2 overall from Baltimore Orioles).
On December 13, 2009 the Pittsburgh Pirates re-signed Ronny Cedeño to a 1-year/$1.125 million contract.
On December 18, 2009 the Pittsburgh Pirates signed Boston Red Sox free agent Javier López to a 1-year contract.
On December 23, 2009 the Pittsburgh Pirates signed Philadelphia Phillies free agent Jack Taschner to a minor league contract.
On January 12, 2010 the Pittsburgh Pirates signed free agent Ryan Church to a 1-year contract and signed Brian Bass, Luke Carlin and Brian Myrow to minor league contracts.
On January 14, 2010 the Pittsburgh Pirates signed free agent D. J. Carrasco to a minor league contract.
On January 16, 2010 the Pittsburgh Pirates signed free agent Brendan Donnelly to a 1-year/$1.5 million contract.
On January 18, 2010 the Pittsburgh Pirates traded Brian Bixler to the Cleveland Indians in exchange for Jesus Brito.
On January 19, 2010 the Pittsburgh Pirates re-signed Zach Duke to a 1-year contract and claimed Brandon Jones off of waivers from the Atlanta Braves.
On January 21, 2010 the Pittsburgh Pirates signed free agent Octavio Dotel to a 1-year contract.
On March 2, 2010 the Pittsburgh Pirates re-signed Ramon Aguero, José Ascanio, Jeff Clement, Argenis Diaz, Joel Hanrahan, Kevin Hart, Gorkys Hernández,  Chris Jakubauskas, Jason Jaramillo, Brandon Jones, Garrett Jones, Andy LaRoche, Brad Lincoln, Andrew McCutchen, Daniel McCutchen, Evan Meek, Lastings Milledge, Bryan Morris, Charlie Morton, Brandon Moss, Ross Ohlendorf, Steve Pearce, John Raynor, José Tábata, Ronald Uviedo, Donnie Veal, Neil Walker and Delwyn Young to 1-year contracts.
On March 29, 2010 the Pittsburgh Pirates claimed Hayden Penn off of waivers from the Florida Marlins.

In-Season
(April 5, 2010 – November 1, 2010)
On April 8, 2010 the Pittsburgh Pirates released Ramon Vazquez.
On April 24, 2010 the Pittsburgh Pirates traded Jonathan Van Every to the Boston Red Sox in exchange for a player to be named later.
On May 18, 2010 the Pittsburgh Pirates signed Latin American prospects Angel Sanchez, Brayan Almonte, Jose Acosta, Jose Roman, Oderman Rocha and Willy Garcia.
On June 1, 2010 the Pittsburgh Pirates traded Ronald Uviedo to the Toronto Blue Jays in exchange for Dana Eveland.
On June 15, 2010 the Pittsburgh Pirates signed draft picks Chase Lyles, Justin Bencsko, Justin Ennis, Kelson Brown, Kevin Decker and Matt Skirving and signed non-drafted free agent Kevin Mort.
On June 18, 2010 the Pittsburgh Pirates signed draft picks Tyler Waldron and Vince Payne.
On June 25, 2010 the Pittsburgh Pirates signed draft pick Justin Howard.
On June 28, 2010 the Pittsburgh Pirates signed draft picks Casey Sadler, James Archibald and Jason Townsend.
On July 2, 2010 the Pittsburgh Pirates signed draft pick Matt Curry.
On July 7, 2010 the Pittsburgh Pirates acquired Sean Gallagher from the San Diego Padres in exchange for cash considerations.
On July 15, 2010 the Pittsburgh Pirates signed draft pick Mel Rojas, Jr.
On July 20, 2010 the Pittsburgh Pirates signed non-drafted free agents Yunior Aquiles, Cristian Henriquez, Yunior Montero, Melvin Rosario, Miguel De Aza, Rodney Polonia, Isaac Sanchez and Heriberto Figueroa.
On July 31, 2010 the Pittsburgh Pirates traded Octavio Dotel to the Los Angeles Dodgers in exchange for James McDonald and Andrew Lambo.
On July 31, 2010 the Pittsburgh Pirates traded Javier López to the San Francisco Giants in exchange for Joe Martinez and John Bowker.
On July 31, 2010 the Pittsburgh Pirates traded Bobby Crosby, D. J. Carrasco and Ryan Church to the Arizona Diamondbacks in exchange for Chris Snyder, Pedro Ciriaco and cash considerations.
On August 4, 2010 the Pittsburgh Pirates claimed Chan Ho Park off of waivers from the New York Yankees and Chris Resop off of waivers from the Atlanta Braves.
On August 9, 2010 the Pittsburgh Pirates signed draft picks Nick Kingham, Brandon Cumpton and Ryan Hafner.
On August 16, 2010 the Pittsburgh Pirates signed draft picks Drew Maggi, Jared Lakind, Jameson Taillon and Stetson Allie.
On August 24, 2010 the Pittsburgh Pirates signed Luis Heredia.
On August 25, 2010 the Pittsburgh Pirates signed Dilson Herrera.
On September 13, 2010 the Pittsburgh Pirates claimed Chris Leroux off of waivers from the Florida Marlins.
On October 4, 2010 the Pittsburgh Pirates announced that John Russell has been relieved of his duties as the club's manager.

Farm system

LEAGUE CHAMPIONS: Altoona, VSL Pirates

References

External links

2010 Pittsburgh Pirates Schedule and Statistics at MLB.com
2010 Pittsburgh Pirates season at Baseball-Reference.com

Pittsburgh Pirates seasons
Pittsburgh Pirates season
Pittsburgh Pirates